Kilingi-Nõmme is a town in Pärnu County, southwestern Estonia. It is the administrative centre of Saarde Parish.

History
The settlement was first mentioned in 1560 when a manor named Ovelgunne (also Kurkund) belonging to the Schilling family was established. In 1789 a tavern was opened in the nearby Nõmme farmstead. Hence the name "Kilingi-Nõmme", Kilingi derived from the Schilling surname. In the 1870s when most of the manor's land was handed out to Orthodox believers, the settlement started to develop faster. Local congregation was established in 1845, and a parish school three years later. Kilingi-Nõmme was then the centre of the surrounding Saarde Parish.

After the establishment of sawmill, flour mill and spinning factory, Kilingi-Nõmme gained the borough rights in 1919 and eventually the town rights on 1 May 1938.

In 1975 the narrow gauge railway was closed and a new  railway was opened in 1981 as part of the Tallinn–Pärnu–Riga railway. Eventually this was also closed in 2000 and dismantled in 2008.

After the reindependence of Estonia in 1991, Kilingi-Nõmme served as a sovereign municipality, but merged with neighbouring Saarde and Tali parishes in 2005, and became the centre of the new Saarde Parish.

Population
As of 2011 Census, the town's population was 1,763.

Notable people
Reio Avaste (born 1976), architect
Liisi Koikson (born 1983), singer
Ants Laaneots (born 1948), military commander
Lauri Laasi (born 1974), politician
Paul Lilleleht (1893–1955), military commander
Marie Reisik (1887–1941), politician and women's rights activist
Mart Siimann (born 1946), politician
Helene Vannari (1948–2022), actress
Toomas Voll (born 1958), composer and choral conductor

References

External links 

Cities and towns in Estonia
Former municipalities of Estonia